This is a list of Indian states, Hilly States and union territory by Innovation Index. The NITI Aayog in collaboration with the Institute for Competitiveness developed benchmark for the innovation ecosystem among Indian States. The data for states and union territory is from niti.gov.in.
As per NITI Aayog Innovation Report Book, Innovation is defined as "creation, development and implementation of a new product, process or service, with the aim of improving efficiency, effectiveness or competitive advantage".

Methodology
Delhi scored the highest at 46.6 while Lakshadweep last with a score of 11.7. But to ensure a fair comparison, states have been categorised under three segments, viz. Northeast India & Hill States, UT & City States, and Major States. The first two categories are segregated from the rest of the Indian states (or Major States) due to their geographical categories, varied sizes and administrative capabilities. 
Indicators used for ranking are :-  *Five Enablers pillars ( Human capital , Investment, Knowledge worker, Business Environment, Safety and Legal Environment )  *Two Performance Pillars (Knowledge Output, Knowledge Diffusion).

List

See also
Human capital
Global Innovation Index
List of Indian states and union territories by GDP
List of Indian states and union territories by GDP per capita
List of Indian states and union territories by Human Development Index
List of Indian states and union territories by literacy rate

References 

Innovation in India